Senator Cain may refer to:

Emily Cain (born 1980), Maine State Senate
Harry P. Cain (1906–1979), U.S. Senator from Washington from 1946 to 1953
William Cain (American politician) (1792–1878), South Carolina State Senate

See also
John Thomas Caine (1829–1911), Utah State Senate